Giannis Gesios (born 3 August 1988) is a Greek professional footballer who plays as a striker.

Club career

Gesios started his career in Edessaikos during 2005 before being transferred to Aris Thessaloniki and his participation in Greece's U-19 team, however he was released in 2008 signing to P.A.O.N.E. where he helped the team to reach Greece's second division in 2009, afterwards he spend two years to Rodos, during which he was loaned to Veria for six months.
In 2011-2012 he played for Anagennisi Epanomi scoring 12 goals, before returning to Aris Thessaloniki in the summer of 2012.

References

1988 births
Living people
Footballers from Edessa, Greece
Greek footballers
Greece youth international footballers
Aris Thessaloniki F.C. players
A.O. Kerkyra players
AO Chania F.C. players
Olympiacos Volos F.C. players
Super League Greece players
Association football forwards